Ravindra Mahajani is a Marathi actor and director. From the late seventies to the mid eighties, Mahajani featured in Marathi films.

Career 
In his early career, he drove taxis and auditioned for films. He created Marathi films until 1987-1988.

He was known as "the Vinod Khanna of the Marathi film industry" due to his personality and looks. Because of his resemblance to Vinod Khanna, director N. Chandra wanted him to star in his 1986 film Ankush. Mahajani declined.

Mahajani featured in many romantic songs, including "Ha Sagar Kinara", "Sumbaran Gao Deva", and "Phite Andharache Jaale". His film Devta is popular among rural fans. He is known for his roles in Duniya Kari Salam (1979), Mumbai cha Fauzdar (1984), Zoonj (1989), Kalat Nakalat (1990) and Aaram haram Ahe. The latter was a major hit while Laxmi Chi Pavale was a blockbuster. He made a comeback with 2015 film Kay Rao Tumhi.

Personal life
Ravindra has a daughter and a son, Gashmeer Mahajani, who is a TV and film actor.

Selected filmography

References

External links

Ravindra Mahajani on worldcat.org

Marathi actors
Male actors from Maharashtra
Male actors in Marathi cinema
Living people
1949 births